Napirisha (Linear Elamite:  Napirriša) was an Elamite deity from the region of Anshan, and was the main deity of the kingdom from at least the late 3rd millennium BCE. In Elamite, his name means "Great (-ša) God (napir)"; in cuneiform texts, the word is written using the ideogram GAL (meaning "great" in Sumerian), which was without a correct interpretation for some time.

Napirisha is depicted as an anthropomorphic deity, often with a snake figure that symbolizes primordial waters. He is thus identified with the Mesopotamian god Enki/Ea, who rules the primordial waters of the abyss. In Elam, he was close to the character of Humban, the great god of the Awan region, which he replaced as a titular deity of Elamite kings around 2000 BCE.

In Anshan, Napirisha did not have a main temple. Napirisha was in all likelihood worshiped in large, open stone sanctuaries, such as Kurangun; he is probably the deity depicted on bas-reliefs with his consort (Kiririsha?) and other deities, providing life water. A large temple dedicated to Napirisha was built in Dur-Untash (Choga-Zambil), in Susa, shared with the local titular god Inshushinak. The template was next to a large ziggurat.

References

Further reading
 Miroschedji, Pierre de. “LE DIEU ÉLAMITE NAPIRISHA”. In: Revue d’Assyriologie et d’archéologie Orientale 74, no. 2 (1980): 129–43. http://www.jstor.org/stable/23282513.

Elamite gods